= Call It =

Azerbaijani rock band

- Genres: Post-punk; new wave; synth rock; folk rock; jangle pop
- Members: Javid Habibli; İlgar Salim

Call It is an Azerbaijani rock band formed in Baku in 2022. The band primarily performs in the genres of post-punk, alternative rock, and modern indie rock. Since its formation, Call It has emerged as one of the notable acts within Azerbaijan's alternative music scene.

== History ==
The band was founded in 2022 by musicians Javid Habibli and Ilgar Salimli. Their music explores themes such as urban life, psychological tension, youth crises, social relationships, and individual freedom. Call It is distinguished by its fusion of classic post-punk aesthetics with contemporary electronic and melodic elements.

== Career ==
Call It's discography includes several singles and studio releases. One of their most notable works is the nine-track album İçindəki Balıq (The Fish Inside You). Following its release, the album attracted attention among alternative music listeners in Azerbaijan and received positive feedback, particularly from younger audiences. The project is regarded as an important milestone in the band's artistic development.

In a relatively short period, Call It gained recognition within the local rock scene through live performances, independent releases, and its distinctive musical approach. The band continues its activities and is considered one of the representatives of the new generation of Azerbaijani alternative music.
